V. echinata may refer to:

 Vermicularia echinata, a plant pathogen
 Vibrissaphora echinata, a Vietnamese amphibian